Esmaeil Bale (born September 16, 1985) is an Iranian footballer who plays for Etka Gorgan F.C. in the Azadegan League.

Club career
Bale joined Etka Gorgan F.C. in 2009 after spending the previous season at Mes Rafsanjan F.C. He was also a member of Shamoushak Noshahr F.C. team who gained promotion into The Iranian Premier League in 2005.

Statistics

References

1985 births
Living people
Etka Gorgan players
Shamoushak Noshahr players
Mes Rafsanjan players
Iranian footballers
Sanat Sari players
Association football defenders
People from Nowshahr
Sportspeople from Mazandaran province